Larisa Udodova (born 12 July 1973) is a Uzbekistani freestyle skier. She competed at the 1992 Winter Olympics and the 1994 Winter Olympics. She was the first woman to represent Uzbekistan at the Olympics.

References

1973 births
Living people
Uzbekistani female freestyle skiers
Olympic freestyle skiers of the Unified Team
Olympic freestyle skiers of Uzbekistan
Freestyle skiers at the 1992 Winter Olympics
Freestyle skiers at the 1994 Winter Olympics
Place of birth missing (living people)
20th-century Uzbekistani women